The 2022–23 Notre Dame Fighting Irish women's basketball team represents the University of Notre Dame during the 2022–23 NCAA Division I women's basketball season. The Fighting Irish are led by third year head coach Niele Ivey and play their home games at Purcell Pavilion as members of the Atlantic Coast Conference.

Previous season

The Fighting Irish finished the season 24–10 overall and 13–5 in ACC play, to finish in a three way tie for third place.  As the third seed in the ACC tournament, they defeated sixth seed Georgia Tech in the Quarterfinals before losing to seventh seed Miami in the Semifinals.  They received and at-large bid to the NCAA tournament and were the fifth seed in the Bridgeport Region.  They defeated twelfth seed UMass in the First Round and fourth seed Oklahoma in the Second Round before losing to NC State in the Sweet Sixteen to end their season.

Offseason

Departures

Incoming Transfers

2022 recruiting class
Source:

Roster

Schedule and results

Source:

|-
!colspan=6 style=| Exhibition

|-
!colspan=6 style=| Regular season

|-
!colspan=6 style=| ACC Women's Tournament
|-

|-
!colspan=6 style=| NCAA Women's Tournament
|-

Rankings

AP does not release a final poll.

References

Notre Dame Fighting Irish women's basketball seasons
Notre Dame
Notre Dame Fighting Irish
Notre Dame Fighting Irish
Notre Dame